Amuria District is a district in the Eastern Region of Uganda. The town of Amuria is the site of the district headquarters.

Location
Amuria District is bordered by Otuke District to the north, Napak District to the northeast, Katakwi District to the east, Soroti District to the south, Kaberamaido District to the southwest, and Alebtong District to the west.

Overview

The district is composed of three counties: Amuria County, Kapelebyong County and Orungo County.

Population
In 1991, the national population census estimated the population of the district at 69,400. The national census in 2002 estimated the population at 180,000. In 2014, the population  was estimated at 183,348.

Economic activities
The economy of Amuria District is based on two main activities: subsistence agriculture and animal husbandry. Over 90 percent of the population engage in either or both activities.

Prominent people
Dr. Peter Eriki, World-class Physician. Worked for the World Health Organization ( WHO) at its headquarters in Geneva, Switzerland, WHO Africa headquarters ( WHO AFRO). Dr. Eriki was WHO Country Resident Representative (Res Rep), for Angola, Kenya and later Nigeria - the most populous country in Africa. Dr. Eriki previously also worked as head of the Uganda National Tuberculosis and Leprosy control program and as Consultant Chest Physician at Mulago National referral hospital in Uganda. Dr. Eriki is a graduate of Makerere University Medical School (MB ChB, and MMed) in Uganda, and Harvard University in the United States of America (USA).
Jeje Odongo, a full general and politician, served as an Army Commander of the Uganda People's Defence Force between 1998 and 2001. He also served as the elected member of parliament for this district between 1988 and 1996. Also served as state minister of defense in the Cabinet of Uganda.  Hon. Jeje Odongo, is Minister of Internal Affairs in the ruling NRM Government.

Adio Winfred, hailing from Amuria district, belonging to Uganda Peoples Congress Political Party. She is a former Constituent Assembly member, part of the legislators who helped Uganda enact the Uganda 1995 Constitution, which among other enshrines the Bill of Rights (See CHAPTER IV), the ownership of land in Uganda to belong to the citizens of Uganda  (see CHAPTER XV) and is held in four tenure systems, namely: a. Customary Tenure, b. Freehold tenure, c. Mailo Tenure and lastly c. Leasehold.
She was a Commissioner at the Amnesty Commission of Uganda. Currently she is Coordinator for Mothers of Hope (MOPE0 which is a Community Based organisation based in Acowa, Amuria district.

Oloka Okello sam a prominent person in Amuria District. Worked as Chemistry Educationist till 2000. Served as Head of Fisheries Department in Amuria District from 2005 to date.

Vance Omome, hailing from Amuria district, is a deputy Ekirigi (Premier) at the Iteso Cultural Union (ICU).

Hon. Musa Ecweru, he is an MP for the NRM Political party and a Minister for State for Disaster Preparedness under the Office of the Prime Minister in Uganda's government.

Hon. Ocen Julius, is from Obalanga Sub County , Kapelebyong County. He is a strong member of UPC political party, currently an MP for Kapelebyong County at the National Parliament as an Independent MP. He was a District Councilor at Katakwi, before Amuria was curved out as a district from Katakwi. Hon. Ocen Julius served as District Chairman for Amuria district under UPC ticket.
He is famed to have, among others worked and advocated for peaceful coexistance between Iteso and Karimojong. He is a defender of the rights of war and cattle rustling victims in Teso sub region. He is founding Chairman for both the Teso War Victims and Cattle Rustling Debt Claimants Association (TEWCCA) and the sister organisation of war victims called Teso WV Multipurpose Cooperative Union. TEWCCA took government of Uganda (the State) to Courts of Law to demand for compensation and reparation for war and cattle rustling victims as part of protracted human rights defence.  A recent High Court ruling at SOROTI district was made in favour of the Teso War Victims.

See also
 Iteso people
 Kumam
 Teso language
 Districts of Uganda

References

External links
  Amuria District Residents Face Eviction Over Minerals Exploration

 
Districts of Uganda
Eastern Region, Uganda
Teso sub-region